The Black Grave is the largest burial mound (kurgan) in Chernihiv, Ukraine. It is part of the National Sanctuary of Ancient Chernihiv and is an Archaeological Monument of national importance.

Overview
Comparable to the barrows of Gnyozdovo near Smolensk, the Black Grave has a height of over 10 metres and a circumference of 170 metres. During excavations undertaken in 1872–73, Dmitry Samokvasov uncovered two cremated bodies of Norse  warriors (probably father and son), surrounded by slaves, sacrificial animals, arms, armour, and decorations. Samokvasov dated the burial to the late 10th century, when Vladimir I was the ruler of Kievan Rus. It is likely that the buried warriors were two princes (knyazes) of Chernihiv, although no local potentate is attested in the Slavonic chronicles before Vladimir's son, Mstislav of Chernihiv.

After the bodies were cremated, they were put upon a 7-metre-high mound, where a funeral feast took place. Arranged near the bodies were two helmets and knee-length chain mail (hauberks), probably extracted from the pyre, as well as a cauldron with ram bones, two sacerdotal knives, two golden Byzantine coins, an imported sabre, a miniature dark-red bronze idol of Thor, and two silver-bound aurochs horns decorated with floral motifs, fabulous animals, and figures of a man and a woman shooting at a bird. When the barrow was completed, a stele was placed at the top. All these items are now displayed at the State Historical Museum in Moscow.

At the present time the site of the burial mound along with other 34 buildings (mostly churches) are included in the Chernihiv National Architecture-Historical Sanctuary "Ancient Chernihiv". The Black Grave along with the rest of the reserve is the major tourist attraction in the Chernihiv Oblast (province) of Ukraine.

References

Bibliography
Dmitry Samokvasov. Могилы русской земли. Moscow, 1908.
Boris Rybakov. Древности Чернигова. // Материалы и исследования по археологии СССР, №11, Moscow-Leningrad, 1949.
T.A. Pushkina. Бронзовый идол из Черной могилы. // Вестник Московского университета. Серия 8. История, №3, 1984.

External links
 Archeological site – Black grave (Ukr.)
 Tourist information: Black Grave (Ukr.)
 Chernihiv State Historical and Architectural Reserve – Ancient Chernihiv (Ukr.)
 List of monuments of cultural heritage in Chernihiv Region (Chernihiv District)

Tourist attractions in Chernihiv
Buildings and structures in Chernihiv
Viking buildings and structures
Kievan Rus'
Archaeological sites in Ukraine
Kurgans
Germanic archaeological sites
Historic sites in Ukraine
Landmarks in Chernihiv Oblast
Protected areas of Ukraine
Ship burials
Tourist attractions in Chernihiv Oblast